The History of Love is a 2016 internationally co-produced romantic drama film directed by Radu Mihăileanu and written by Mihăileanu and Marcia Romano, based on the 2005 novel of the same name by Nicole Krauss. The film stars Derek Jacobi, Sophie Nélisse, Gemma Arterton and Elliott Gould.

Cast 
 Derek Jacobi as Léo Gursky
 Mark Rendall as young Léo Gursky
 Sophie Nélisse as Alma Singer
 Gemma Arterton as Alma Mereminski
 Elliott Gould as Bruno Leibovitch
 Corneliu Ulici as young Bruno Leibovitch
 Torri Higginson as Charlotte Singer
 William Ainscough as Bird Singer
 Alex Ozerov as Misha Strumann
 Jamie Bloch as Zoey Schwartz
 Claudiu Maier as Zvi Litvinoff
 Daniel Matmor as Dr. Zilberstein
 Jean-Carl Boucher as Herman Connor
 Simona Maican as Rosa 
 Julian Bailey as Jeff
 Cary Lawrence as Hilary 
 Peter Spence as Bernard Moritz

Production 
The History of Love was shot in various locations, including Montreal, New York City, Cluj-Napoca and Bucharest.

References

External links 
 
 
 

2016 films
2016 romantic drama films
English-language Canadian films
English-language Romanian films
English-language Belgian films
English-language French films
Yiddish-language films
French romantic drama films
Canadian romantic drama films
Romanian romantic drama films
American romantic drama films
Belgian romantic drama films
Films directed by Radu Mihăileanu
Films based on American novels
2010s Canadian films
2010s American films
2010s French films